The 1939 Chatham Cup was the 16th annual nationwide knockout football competition in New Zealand.

The competition was run on a regional basis, with regional associations each holding separate qualifying rounds.

Teams taking part in the final rounds are known to have included Ponsonby, Waterside (Wellington), Hamilton Wanderers, Western (Christchurch), and Mosgiel.

The 1939 final
Waterside became the first team to successfully defend the trophy - something they were to again achieve the following year. Sonny Ward became the first player to score in two successive finals.

Results

Semi-finals

Final

References

Rec.Sport.Soccer Statistics Foundation New Zealand 1939 page

Chatham Cup
Chatham Cup
Chatham Cup